Genesia might refer to:
 An Ancient Greek festival of the dead
 An expert system developed by Électricité de France in the 1980s
 The European title of Ultimate Domain, a 1992 computer game from Microïds
 Genesia, a planet from the Star Wars expanded universe
 Genesia, a planet from Buck Rogers in the 25th Century (TV series).